Lurnea High School (abbreviated as LHS) is a government-funded co-educational comprehensive secondary day school located in , a south-western suburb of Sydney, New South Wales, Australia.

Established in 1965, the school caters for approximately 650 students in 2018, from Year 7 to Year 12, of whom four percent identified as Indigenous Australians and eighty percent were from a language background other than English. The school is operated by the New South Wales Department of Education; and the current principal is Kylie Landrigan.

Overview
An Intensive English Centre and Hearing Impaired Unit are also established at Lurnea High School. Lurnea High School also has numerous science, art and home economics classrooms. It also has many Interactive White Boards (Smartboards).

The school logo of Lurnea High School is a platypus.

See also 

 List of government schools in New South Wales
 Education in Australia

References

External links 
 

Educational institutions established in 1965
1965 establishments in Australia
South Western Sydney
Public high schools in New South Wales